In enzymology, a pentanamidase is an enzyme that catalyzes the chemical reaction

pentanamide + H2O  pentanoate + NH3

Thus, the two substrates of this enzyme are pentanamide and H2O, whereas its two products are valerate and NH3.

This enzyme belongs to the family of hydrolases, those acting on carbon-nitrogen bonds other than peptide bonds, specifically in linear amides.  The systematic name of this enzyme class is pentanamide amidohydrolase. This enzyme is also called valeramidase.

References

 

EC 3.5.1
Enzymes of unknown structure